The 1961 Football Championship of Ukrainian SSR (Class B) was the 31st season of association football competition of the Ukrainian SSR, which was part of the Ukrainian Class B. It was the twelfth in the Soviet Class B. 

The 1961 Football Championship of Ukrainian SSR (Class B) was won by FC Chornomorets Odesa.

Location map

Zone 1

Relegated teams
 none

Promoted teams
 none

Relocated and renamed teams
 FC Mayak Kherson was last year known as FC Spartak Kherson
 FC Desna Chernihiv was last year known as FC Avanhard Chernihiv
 FC Verkhovyna Uzhhorod was last year known as FC Spartak Uzhhorod

League's standing

Zone 2

Relegated teams
 none

Promoted teams
 SKA Kiev – (debut)

Relocated and renamed teams
 SKF Sevastopol was last year known as SKCF Sevastopol
 FC Azovstal Zhdanov was last year known as FC Avanhard Zhdanov

League's standing

Play-offs

 FC Chornomorets Odesa - SKA Odesa 2:1 0:0
 FC Lokomotyv Vinnytsia - FC Trudovi Rezervy Luhansk 0:0 2:0
 FC Zirka Kirovohrad - FC Avanhard Zhovti Vody 2:1 0:0
 SKA Lviv - FC Metalurh Zaporizhia 0:0 2:1
 FC Avanhard Simferopol - FC Desna Chernihiv 2:0 2:2
 FC Shakhtar Horlivka - FC Polissya Zhytomyr 3:1 2:1
 FC Sudnobudivnyk Mykolaiv - FC Khimik Severodonetsk 2:2 2:2
 SKF Sevastopol - FC Dynamo Khmelnytskyi 4:2 1:1
 FC Kolhospnyk Poltava - FC Avanhard Chernivtsi 1:0 2:3
 FC Avanhard Sumy - FC Kolhospnyk Rivno 2:1 1:1
 FC Azovstal Zhdanov - FC Verkhovyna Uzhhorod 0:0 0:0
 FC Spartak Stanislav - SKA Kiev 3:0 3:3
 FC Lokomotyv Stalino - FC Mayak Kherson 3:1 1:1
 FC Metalurh Dnipropetrovsk - FC Avanhard Ternopil 2:1 1:0
 FC Avanhard Kryvyi Rih - FC Arsenal Kyiv 1:0 1:0
 FC Shakhtar Kadiivka - FC Kolhospnyk Cherkasy 3:1 1:0
 FC Avanhard Kramatorsk - FC Naftovyk Drohobych 3:1 3:2
 FC Volyn Lutsk - FC Torpedo Kharkiv 2:0 1:3
 FC Khimik Dniprodzerzhynsk - bye

Relegation play-offs

 FC Volyn Lutsk - GDO Vladimir-Volynskiy 4:2 1:1
 FC Khimik Dniprodzerzhynsk - FC Trubnyk Nikopol 0:0 0:2
 FC Polissya Zhytomyr - FC Chervona Zirka Malyn +:- 
 FC Verkhovyna Uzhhorod - FC Kolhospnyk Berehovo 1:1 0:0 2:0
 FC Zirka Kirovohrad - FC Shakhtar Oleksandriya 3:0 3:1
 SKF Sevastopol - FC Metalurh Kerch 2:0 2:0
 FC Metalurh Zaporizhia - FC Burevisnyk Melitopol 2:2 2:1
 FC Kolhospnyk Poltava - FC Lokomotyv Poltava 2:0 5:2
 FC Kolhospnyk Rivno - FC Spartak Rivno 2:1 1:1
 FC Shakhtar Kadiivka - FC Avanhard Sverdlovsk 2:1 2:0 0:0
 FC Avanhard Sumy - FC Ekran Shostka 4:2 1:1
 FC Avanhard Ternopil - FC Burevisnyk Kremenets 2:2 2:0
 FC Torpedo Kharkiv - FC Start Chuhuyiv 3:0 1:0
 FC Mayak Kherson - FC Enerhiya Nova Kakhovka 2:1 1:0
 FC Avanhard Kamianets-Podilskyi - FC Dynamo Khmelnytskyi 1:0 0:3
 FC Kolhospnyk Cherkasy - FC Shakhtar Vatutine 3:1 1:1
 FC Avanhard Chernivtsi - FC Mashynobudivnyk Chernivtsi 1:0 4:0
 FC Desna Chernihiv - FC Zirka Chernihiv 6:0 5:0
 FC Arsenal Kyiv - FC Temp Kyiv 2:1 3:1
 FC Spartak Stanislav - FC Khimik Kalush 1:0 2:1
 FC Avanhard Kramatorsk - FC Metalurh Yenakievo 4:0 1:2
 FC Naftovyk Drohobych - FC Silmash Lviv 1:1 3:1
 FC Sudnobudivnyk Mykolaiv - FC Torpedo Mykolaiv 1:1 2:0

Notes:
 Games between SKA Odessa and FC Lokomotyv Vinnytsia with champions of their respective oblasts were not conducted as the aforementioned teams finished in top three teams in each of the Class B zones.
 The champion of Kiev Oblast did not participate in relegation play-offs as the oblast did not have its own representative in the Class B competitions.
 FC Khimik Dniprodzerzhynsk has kept its place in the Class B competitions.
 FC Shakhtar Oleksandriya was promoted to the Class B even though it lost the relegation play-offs.

See also
 Soviet Second League

Notes

References

External links
 1961 season regulations.  Luhansk football portal
 1961 Soviet championships (all leagues) at helmsoccer.narod.ru

1961
2
Soviet
Soviet
football
Football Championship of the Ukrainian SSR